Basil Abdullah Ahmed Al-Rawahi (born 25 September 1993) is an Omani international footballer who plays as a left back for Omani club Dhofar.

International career
Basil was part of the first team squad of the Oman national football team. He was selected for the national team for the first time in 2012 and made his first appearance for Oman on 20 December 2012 against Bahrain in the 2012 WAFF Championship. He has made appearances in the 2012 WAFF Championship and the 2014 WAFF Championship.

Career statistics

Honours

Club
With Fanja
Sultan Qaboos Cup: 2013-14
Oman Professional League Cup: 2014-15
Oman Super Cup: 2012

References

External links
 
 
 
 
 

1993 births
Living people
Omani footballers
People from Ad Dakhiliyah Governorate
Association football fullbacks
Fanja SC players
Dhofar Club players
Oman Professional League players
Oman international footballers
Asian Games competitors for Oman
Footballers at the 2014 Asian Games